Griffith Griffith may be:
 Griffith W. Griffith (1883–1967), minister
 Griffith J. Griffith (1850–1919), businessman
 Griffith Griffith (Penryn), 1823–1899, founder of Penryn, California